Johnson Creek may refer to:
 Johnson Creek (Georgia), a waterway of the Atlantic Intracoastal Waterway
 Johnson Creek Airport, a grass airstrip in central Idaho
 Johnson Creek (Mississippi River), a stream in Minnesota
 Johnson Creek (Davis Creek), a stream in Missouri
 Johnson Creek (Turnback Creek), a stream in Missouri
 Johnson Creek (Ararat River tributary), a stream in North Carolina and Virginia
 Johnson Creek (Willamette River), a tributary of the Willamette River in Oregon
 Johnson Creek (Lithia Springs Creek tributary), a tributary of Lithia Springs Creek in Pennsylvania
 Johnson Creek (James River), a stream in South Dakota
 Johnson Creek (Texas), a tributary in the Trinity River watershed in north Texas
 Johnson Creek (Iron County, Utah)
 Johnson Creek (Skookumchuck River tributary), a stream in Washington state
 Johnson Creek (Rock River tributary), a stream in southern Wisconsin
 Johnson Creek, Wisconsin, a village in southern Wisconsin

See also
 Ardenwald-Johnson Creek, Portland, Oregon
 Johnson Branch (disambiguation)
 Johnson River (disambiguation)
 Johnsons Creek Natural Area Preserve, a Natural Area Preserve in Alleghany County, Virginia